Litterial Maurice Green (born March 7, 1970) is an American former professional basketball player who played at the point guard position. He was listed at 6'1" or 6'2".

Biography 
Green played high school basketball at Moss Point High School in Mississippi, where he averaged 39.7 points per game as a senior to lead the nation in scoring. He also tallied 9.5 rebounds, 7.0 assists and 3.0 steals per game. He was a McDonald's All-American and a Parade Magazine All-American. In 1999, he was ranked #37 on Sports Illustrateds list of Mississippi's 50 Greatest Sports Figures.

Green played college basketball at the University of Georgia, where he became UGA's all-time leading scorer (2,111). He also became the school's all-time leader in assists. He led the Bulldogs to their only Southeastern Conference Championship in 1990, and was an All Southeastern Conference selection in 1990, 1991, and 1992. Green is the only basketball player in UGA history to score 2,000 points, and is one of three players in the history of the Southeastern Conference to record over 2000 points and 400 assists, joining Pete Maravich and Allan Houston.

Chosen in the second round of the 1992 NBA draft by the Chicago Bulls, Green played from 1992 to '94 for the Orlando Magic, as a backup to both Scott Skiles and Penny Hardaway. After a full season with the Detroit Pistons (1996–97), he signed with the Milwaukee Bucks in 1997–98 and the Cleveland Cavaliers in 1999, punctuated by spells with the Quad City Thunder in the Continental Basketball Association.

From 1999 to 2002, Green played overseas in Venezuela, Turkey, Poland and Slovenia.

In 2003, Green was hired to coach the Southern Crescent Lightning of the World Basketball Association. He won the league's Coach of the Year Award when his team won the league championship. He later served as the head coach of the Chattanooga Steamers of the American Basketball Association. Green has also worked for ESPN College Basketball as an analyst and has been a consultant to NBA teams.

NBA career statistics

Regular season

|-
| align="left" | 1992–93
| align="left" | Orlando
| 52 || 4 || 12.0 || .439 || .100 || .625 || 0.7 || 2.2 || 0.4 || 0.1 || 4.5
|-
| align="left" | 1993–94
| align="left" | Orlando
| 29 || 0 || 4.3 || .386 || .250 || .757 || 0.4 || 0.3 || 0.2 || 0.0 || 2.5
|-
| align="left" | 1996–97
| align="left" | Detroit
| 45 || 0 || 6.9 || .469 || .000 || .638 || 0.5 || 0.9 || 0.4 || 0.0 || 2.0
|-
| align="left" | 1997–98
| align="left" | Milwaukee
| 21 || 0 || 5.9 || .217 || .000 || .750 || 0.3 || 0.8 || 0.2 || 0.0 || 1.2
|-
| align="left" | 1998–99
| align="left" | Cleveland
| 1 || 0 || 2.0 || .000 || .000 || .000 || 0.0 || 0.0 || 0.0 || 0.0 || 0.0
|- class="sortbottom"
| style="text-align:center;" colspan="2"| Career
| 148 || 4 || 8.0 || .420 || .077 || .665 || 0.5 || 1.2 || 0.3 || 0.0 || 2.9
|}

References

External links
NBA stats at Basketball-Reference
Basketpedya career data
Profile at Eurobasket.com

1970 births
Living people
African-American basketball players
American expatriate basketball people in Poland
American expatriate basketball people in Slovenia
American expatriate basketball people in Turkey
American expatriate basketball people in Venezuela
American men's basketball players
Basketball players from Mississippi
Chicago Bulls draft picks
Cleveland Cavaliers players
Detroit Pistons players
Georgia Bulldogs basketball players
KK Zlatorog Laško players
Marinos B.B.C. players
McDonald's High School All-Americans
Milwaukee Bucks players
Orlando Magic players
Parade High School All-Americans (boys' basketball)
People from Pascagoula, Mississippi
Point guards
Quad City Thunder players
Unia Tarnów basketball players
21st-century African-American sportspeople
20th-century African-American sportspeople
Polluelos de Aibonito players